Paula Campbell is an American R&B singer from Baltimore, Maryland who first gained prominence as a contestant on Baltimore Idol.

Biography
Campbell was raised on the west side of Baltimore, and attended Frederick Douglass High School. Armed with confidence, brains and beauty, urban/R&B songstress Campbell has a story to tell. Growing up in Baltimore, Maryland, Campbell's home life was anything but stable, yet she continuously kept the faith and her music expresses songs from the heart and soul of a real survivor.

Her first major exposure was in the 2003 Baltimore Idol, where she placed in the top 8. After the competition, DJ Rod Lee of Baltimore radio station 92Q contacted Campbell, and together the two cut a track, "How Does it Feel", which featured local rapper Tim Trees and became a regional hit. How Does It Feel was number on in Baltimore, DC and Virginia for 8 weeks straight . In 2004, she released her first album, Who Got Next? on independent label Blakbyrd Music, which hit #92 on the Billboard R&B charts.

She opened for Kanye West at a Baltimore show and sang on a remix of Fat Joe's "Lean Back" which received some national attention. She began writing a second album in 2005 but placed the project on hold after signing to Sony BMG in May of that year, who had planned to release her second effort, I Am Paula Campbell, late in 2006. The release of the album was delayed, however, and it has yet to be released. In 2009, she released her Mixtape/Street album, 'Dreammaker'.

Campbell won a Glamour magazine music contest and shot a music video for the song "Ain't Nobody Stupid", directed by Ciara. "Ain't Nobody Stupid" was written by Ne-Yo, with whom Campbell toured in the summer of 2007. In 2009, Campbell began her I Am Paula Campbell Mini tour in the Dmv area.

Discography

Singles

References

External links

Campbell at Instagram

Singer-songwriters from Maryland
American women pop singers
20th-century African-American women singers
Musicians from Baltimore
Living people
21st-century American women singers
21st-century American singers
American women singer-songwriters
1981 births
African-American songwriters
21st-century African-American women singers